Bourei Cholsar District is a district located in Takeo Province, in southern Cambodia. According to the 1998 census of Cambodia, it had a population of 24,460.

Administration
As of 2019, Bourei Cholsar District has 5 communes, 39 villages.

References

 
Districts of Takéo province